The 2024 Florida Republican presidential primary will be held on March 19, 2024, as part of the Republican Party primaries for the 2024 presidential election. 125 delegates to the 2024 Republican National Convention will be allocated on a winner-take-all basis. The contest will be held alongside primaries in Arizona, Illinois, and Ohio.

Candidates 
Former president Donald Trump and former South Carolina governor and U.S. Ambassador to the United Nations Nikki Haley are the only main contenders to officially announce their candidacy so far, although Florida governor Ron DeSantis is widely expected to announce his candidacy as soon as May 2023.

Endorsements

Polling

See also 
 2024 Republican Party presidential primaries
 2024 United States presidential election
 2024 United States presidential election in Florida
 2024 United States elections

Notes 

Partisan clients

References 

Florida Republican primaries
Republican presidential primary
Florida